Scot Loeffler (born November 1, 1974) is an American football coach and former player.  He is currently the head coach at Bowling Green State University. He formerly served as offensive coordinator and quarterbacks coach at Boston College. He was previously the offensive coordinator and quarterbacks coach at Virginia Tech, having previously held the same role at Auburn University under head coach Gene Chizik. Prior to joining Auburn, Loeffler served as offensive coordinator for Temple. He has spent over a decade coaching quarterbacks, primarily in the Big Ten and Southeastern conferences.  On November 28, 2018, Loeffler was named head coach at BGSU.

Career
Loeffler played quarterback for the Michigan Wolverines from 1993 to 1996. After suffering a shoulder injury that prematurely ended his playing career, Loeffler joined Lloyd Carr's coaching staff at his alma mater as a graduate assistant, and was a part of the Wolverine staff during the 1997 undefeated, national championship season. In 2000, Loeffler was named quarterbacks coach at Central Michigan University.  After coaching the Chippewas for two years, Loeffler returned to coaching quarterbacks at Michigan for the next six years.

In 2008, the Detroit Lions of the National Football League hired Loeffler to be a part of their offensive staff. However, after only one season out of the college ranks, Loeffler was hired by Urban Meyer to join his staff at Florida. Loeffler served as quarterbacks coach, where in his first season he was tasked with helping Tim Tebow become a more polished pro-style quarterback. Tebow finished the season ranked 1st in passer efficiency.

When Steve Addazio was let go from Florida to eventually become the new head coach at Temple University, he brought Loeffler along as the new offensive coordinator and quarterbacks coach. Under his leadership, the Owls offense improved to the 7th leading rushing offense in the nation (257 yards per game) and 33rd nationally in pass efficiency (142.8). The team finished the season 9–4, ranked 2nd in the MAC East and defeated Wyoming 37–15 in the 2011 New Mexico Bowl (the school's first bowl win since the 1979 Garden State Bowl). Sophomore quarterback Chris Coyer was named the bowl's MVP and finished the season with a 177.4 passer rating.

Loeffler was linked to the vacant OC positions at the University of Alabama, Louisiana State University and the University of Wisconsin.

On January 22, 2012, head coach Gene Chizik hired Loeffler to serve as offensive coordinator and quarterbacks coach at Auburn.

At the end of the 2012 season, Chizik was fired by Auburn. Former offensive coordinator Gus Malzahn was hired as head coach on December 4, 2012. Shortly after being hired, Malzahn announced that all assistant coaches were being released, thus ending Loeffler's career at Auburn University.  The offense finished the season dead last in the SEC in total yds/gm and pass yds/gm at 305 and 156.6, respectively.  They also finished second to last with 18.7 pts/gm.

On January 18, 2013, Virginia Tech head coach Frank Beamer announced Loeffler's hiring as one of three new Hokies offensive assistants, along with offensive line coach Jeff Grimes (also formerly of Auburn) and wide receivers coach Aaron Moorehead (formerly of Stanford University).

Loeffler has experience coaching in 11 bowl games including the 1999 Citrus Bowl, 2000 Orange Bowl, 2003 Outback Bowl, 2004 Rose Bowl, 2005 Rose Bowl, 2005 Alamo Bowl, 2007 Rose Bowl, 2008 Capital One Bowl, 2010 Sugar Bowl, 2011 New Mexico Bowl, 2013 Sun Bowl, 2014 Military Bowl, and the 2015 Independence Bowl.

On November 28th, 2018 Loeffler was hired as the head coach of Bowling Green State University. Loeffler was taking over a Falcon program riddled by APR and off-field issues, as well as a team that in the last regime fell apart under Mike Jinks. Jinks took over with Bowling Green coming off of 3 straight MAC East Championships, winning the MAC twice and went just 4-8, 2-10, and 1-7 before being fired. Interim coach Carl Pelini went 2-3 to finish the year. In all of the press conferences, Coach Loeffler detailed a rebuild plan that would take time. With just 2 scholarship quarterbacks on the roster, one a transfer and one a former walk-on, Loeffler's Falcons went 3-9 in year 1. The season was highlighted by beating BGSU's biggest rival Toledo for the first time in a decade 20-7 in the Battle of I-75 as 30-point underdogs at home. The COVID 2020 season went 0-5. 2021 saw an improved 4-8 record, highlighted by a massive 38-point upset at Minnesota 14-10. 2022 started off tough, with an FCS loss to EKU in 7 overtimes, followed by a monumental homecoming win over Marshall who had just crushed 8th-ranked Notre Dame the week before. The Falcons started off MAC play 1-1, suffering a blowout loss to Buffalo but then won their next 3 conference games. BGSU finished the 2022 season 6-6, and was ranked 3rd in the MAC East with a 5-3 conference record. It received an invitation to play New Mexico State in the Quick Lane Bowl.

On October 30, 2021, Loeffler became the first head coach to be ejected for two unsportsmanlike conduct calls.

Personal life
Loeffler received his bachelor's degree from the University of Michigan in 1996 and a graduate degree in history and political science in 1998. He earned the Michigan Athletic Academic Achievement award during the 1997–98 academic year. Loeffler has a son, Luke, from his first marriage and two children, Alexis and Mary Elizabeth, with his current wife, Amie. He was a college quarterback coach to Tom Brady and is reported to be one of his closest friends.

Head coaching record

References

External links
 Bowling Green profile
 Boston College profile
 Temple profile

1974 births
Living people
American football quarterbacks
Auburn Tigers football coaches
Boston College Eagles football coaches
Bowling Green Falcons football coaches
Central Michigan Chippewas football coaches
Detroit Lions coaches
Florida Gators football coaches
Michigan Wolverines football coaches
Michigan Wolverines football players
Temple Owls football coaches
Virginia Tech Hokies football coaches
People from Barberton, Ohio
Coaches of American football from Ohio
Players of American football from Ohio